Yerakini or Gerakini is a village in the Chalkidiki peninsula in Central Macedonia, Northern Greece.

It has been the port
 of nearby Polygyros, the capital town of Chalkidiki, ever since its settlement. It has the largest magnesite deposits in Northern Greece.

Etymology
The word Γερακινή (Yerakini) comes from γερακίνα (yerakina meaning female peregrine falcon (falcon-gentle) (from γεράκι, from ιέραξ falcon).
There is a legend that the name came from a queen named Yerakina (Gerakina) who lived in Yerakini once.

Location 
Yerakini lies on the gulf of Torone, between the two peninsulas of Kassandra and Sithonia, southeast of Thessaloniki.

Yerakini is at a distance of 14.5 km (9 mi.) from Polygyros, 77 km (48 mi.) from Thessaloniki, via Polygyros, or 78 km, via Nea Moudania, and 66 km (41 mi.) from the Thessaloniki International Airport.

Climate and weather
The climate is Mediterranean and temperate throughout the year with mild winters (very rarely below 0 °C), serene sky for most part of the year, which contributes considerably to the growing of olives in the area, also allowing shepherds from other regions, especially in the past, to winter their flocks of sheep and goats and other animals there. Average temperature ranges from 10 degrees °C. in winter to 35 degrees °C. in summer (Jul Aug).

Economy 

Agriculture: farming, chiefly for green olives. It is the center of olive growing in Chalkidiki, hence the first green olive preservation plant of Chalkidiki, established there, by the government in the seventies. Olive husbandry has developed rapidly in recent years as monoculture of the farmers.
Tourism the principal occupation in the summer, for all those, inhabitants of Yerakini or from other areas, involved in tourist services and products at the seaside such as accommodation, food, and folk product shops.
Mining of magnesite for workers mostly commuting from other areas of Chakidiki, mainly from Zervochoria (villages in the north of Chalkidiki).
Its geographical position is a plus for future business development in tourism and other activities (central depots, cash and carry, shopping malls etc.).

History 
Yerakini and nearby Kalyves Polygyrou were settled by farmers from Polygyros in the late 1800s and early 1900s who belong to its municipal administration as municipal units.

Until the 1960s, there was one olive oil mill in the area on the central beach owned by the Haji Osman family. During World War II there was the Administration Center of the area, which, among other activities, extended the main dock, whose remains still extant, for vessel freights for use by the occupying German army. Divers and amateur fishers used both parts of the dock for diving and fishing. There was also a lighthouse on the right side of the main dock.

Current day 
The village of Yerakini, has the church of patron saints Agioi Theodoroi (dedicated to two saints having the same name Theodoros). 
	

The annual feast day commemorating the saints is held on the first Saturday of Lent, the religious church service officiated by Metropolitan Nicodemus of Kassandreia, the people celebrating with a number of activities also at the seaside.

	
All land (fields, plains and slopes as well as the biggest part of the Trikorfo (three peaks) mountain in the east, 3.5 km away from Yerakini) is covered with olive groves. The inhabitants are farmers principally growing olives for the table and their oil.

There are several olive oil mills in the area (in Polygyros, Kalyves Polygyrou, Olynthos, Ormylia) and companies for green table olives preservation. Olives are harvested while green for table olives in September and, mainly for olive oil, when black in November and December. The language spoken is the Greek dialect of Chalkidiki, as spoken in its capital Polygyros. Yerakini has a soccer team, which plays against other teams of Chalkidiki. Although the village itself is not tourist-oriented, holidaymakers visit it especially for the Divine Liturgy (The Sunday Mass of the Orthodox) of the church and on saints' feast days.

Seaside 

The southern part, the sea-side of Yerakini where the Customs Office is situated. It is a part of the coastline stretching from Psakoudia (5 km from Yerakini) in the east, to Kalyves Polygyrou in the west. The Yerakini coast covers the area between Trikorfo beach (formerly known as "Tou Iatrou i Kalyva" locally ) and that of "Kalamaras and Pangalos" summer residences (formerly "Tou Mourlakou to Pigadi", "Mourlakos' Well", locally  ).

Beaches 

The seaside consists of white sandy beaches, and bays of various sizes: the central, the eastern and the western are the longest ones, extended up to Kalyves Polygyrou beach, and many more smaller ones east) of clear blue waters.

The eastern seaside (between the central beach and Psakoudia)  consists of Gerakina Beach, Douros Residences (Gerakini Mare), Kipoupolis (Garden Town), Porto Maria, Kouyoni beach, Sonia Village Beach, Galini and  Trikorfo beach. The western seaside (between the central beach and the Mecyberna 
 
complex) consists of Lazaridika, Megika, Bazakeika (Martha Haus), Katsarou, Goloika, The Well (Pigadi), Nea Kalyvia, Alkinoos, Poseidon, Scorpios, Toronis, Amphitrite, Gerania and Sermyle Complex, Sermyle Complex, Gerania, Amphitrite, Toronis, Scorpios, Poseidon, Alkinoos, Nea Kalyvia and Molyvopyrgos beaches. It has bay beaches and inlets especially at the eastern rocky sea-coast joining the pine wooded Psakoudia beach, the main beach of Ormylia's.
 

Yerakini's seaside is one of the main vacation resorts of Chalkidiki and attracts thousands of visitors from April to October. It can be reached by bus or car from Thessaloniki via Polygyros or Nea Moudania, or by sea by passing through Potidaia's canal, or by the primary opening between the two fingers of Kassandra and Sithonia. It has a mooring bay on the Aegean Sea
.

Yerakini is a departure point for exploring Chalkidiki, with easy access to the peninsula and excursions to the three smaller peninsulas, Kassandra, Sithonia, and Porto Carras. Mount Athos is to the east, Stageira, Aristotle's birthplace, to the northeast, the archeological sites of Olynthus and Potidea, Petralona cave to the west, and densely wooded Mount Cholomon 15 km north. Thessaloniki, the Byzantine historical city and capital of Greek Macedonia is to the northwest.

Tourism in Chalkidiki officially began in the late 1950s (Tourism Development Plan by PM Konstantinos Karamanlis), and in the late 1960s it was declared one of four areas of “Prime Zone for Tourism Development in Greece”, the other three being Corfu, Rhodes and Crete.

The Yerakini seaside began its development in 1959 when the official tourism development began and the first public tourist pavilion  started operating at the seaside. Similar pavilions opened in Olympiada and Ierissos. In the early 1970s the first hotel and bungalows summer resort in Chalkidiki, Gerakina Beach Hotel, opened at the eastern beach, 600 m from the central beach (currently operating, after reconstruction, under the new trade name Ikos Olivia), and later more accommodation and other facilities were built for the increasing number of holidaymakers.

Magnesite mines

The subsoil in the area of Yerakini as well as of Patelidas and Vavdos is rich in magnesite. The topsoil is suitable for olive cultivation. In the northern part, the mines of Yerakini, most residents are workers and technicians working at plants of the large Grecian Magnesite company, established in 1959, which mines ore, the raw material of magnesite. 

Vessels come to the Nea Moudania harbour,  from Yerakini, on the Thermaic gulf, before the peninsula of Kassandra, to load magnesite

History of the magnesite mines 
The Yerakini area has the most extensive deposits of magnesite in Greece in many parts and particularly in the north and northeast, making underground wealth an attraction for exploitation by Greek and foreign companies, which have exploited the deposits for more than 100 years with opencast mining quarries, kilns etc. Crude magnesite was produced in Greece in 1910.  It was first found in Atalanti and in the Province of Lokris, central Greece. The Anglo-Greek Magnesite Co. Ltd

(AGM) was the first mining operator in Yerakini. In 1959 G. Portolos (Grecian Magnesite) bought the magnesite operations and continued the exploitation of magnesite deposits. There are also other minor magnesite mining deposits especially in the southwestern foothills of Trikorfo mountain exploited by Antoniou and Xenakis concern for a long period in the 1950s and 1960s. Other localities were Perachori, near Corinth; Ermioni (or Kastri) and on Spetses Island in southern Argolis in the Peloponnese; on Paros Island (Cyclades); around Thebes (Thiva), in Boeotia (Viotia) and in Papades
 and Troupi
in northern Euboea (Evia). Euboea (Evia island) was mostly worked until the 1980s.

Galataki (near Limni) and Afrati (near Halkida) were exploited by the English company Petrified Ltd., which sold its assets to AGM in 1902. Northern Greece was also found to have magnesite, in the concessions of Aghia Paraskevi (east of Thessaloniki) in small production, and in Chalkidiki's concessions of Vavdos, 
 Patelidas 
 
(11.5 km far from Yerakini), and Yerakini with the largest deposits.

Brief history of The Anglo-Greek Magnesite Co. Ltd 

Anglo-Greek  (AGM) purchased the assets of the English company Petrified Ltd with mines at Galataki (near Limni) and Afrati (near Halkida) of Euboea in 1902. AGM also acquired the assets of the Societe Hellenique des Mines de Magnesite, with mines at Limni, Mantoudi, and Pyli village on the east coast of Euboea island, in 1912. The raw material was shipped by the Galataki harbour.

AGM ceased its activity on Euboea island after World War II, the railway it employed (750 mm and 600 mm gauge) was dismantled and the rolling stock was sold for scrap, today some ruined parts still existing. The Anglo-Greek Magnesite Co. Ltd was the principal operator for the first half of the twentieth century in Greece. In 1922 it also purchased the Yerakini concession, producing 27,000 tons of raw material per year. The deposits were estimated at 300,000 tons in 1947. It used coal and brushwood as well as trunk wood for fuel of its kilns

The Yerakini mines about 3 km inland from the Gulf were reached by means of a narrow-gauge (565 mm) railway, used also by the new owners until the 1980s. The Anglo-Greek Company operated a power system supplying electricity in the mines area in the fifties. It organized various events and activities, such as soccer matches, weekend balls etc. In 1959 it sold its assets to the Greek-owned Portolos Co.

Gallery

See also
Greek National Tourism Organization
Tourism in Greece
Magnesite in Greece
Magnesium

References

External links

Villages in Greece
Manganese mines in Greece